Yudh is a 1985 Indian Hindi-language action thriller film, produced by Gulshan Rai and marks the directorial debut of his son Rajiv Rai. The film features a large star cast including Jackie Shroff, Anil Kapoor (in dual role), Tina Munim, Pran, Danny Denzongpa, Nutan, Shatrughan Sinha and Hema Malini.

Plot
Savitri's twin baby sons are snatched by notorious criminal Gama Mateen, who demands a ransom in exchange for returning the sons to Savitri. Inspector Bhargav comes to the aid of Savitri but is himself killed in the process while trying to save Savitri's twin sons. Gama goes on the run taking one of the twins with him while the other is missing. After Inspector Bhargav's death, Savitri brings up Bhargav's son, Vikram, as her own son.

Many years later, Vikram has grown up to be a police inspector like his dad. And Savitri's two children who Savitri has not seen since they were babies have grown up to be Public Prosecutor Avinash and an underworld criminal named Junior. Junior was brought up by Gama to become a sharpshooter hitman and Gama uses him to kill off whoever he wants and Avinash is blamed each time for the killings. Avinash is also coincidentally the best friend of Vikram. Vikram begins to suspect that Avinash is not all he seems when a witness identifies Avinash as one of the men involved in a heist. Avinash protests his innocence and after many misunderstandings, it is discovered that his twin brother Junior is behind all the killings and heists. Vikram also discovers that his father had been killed by Gama Mateen when he was just a child so he sets out to avenge his father and reunite Savitri with her two sons but unfortunately Junior is killed by Gama Mateen when he discovers that the had sent him to kill his own mother. Gama Mateen kidnaps Avinash and bring him to his cage. Avinash was shocked to see his lookalike, Junior. Gama replaces Junior to Avinash's place to kill Savitri Devi. When Junior realises that Savitri Devi is his mother, he scolds Gama. Gama sends his goon to kill Junior and he does. When they found Junior's cadaver, they presumed that Avinash is dead but they discover that Avinash is alive and he is with Gama Mateen.

Cast
 Jackie Shroff as Police Inspector Vikram 'Vicky'
 Anil Kapoor as Avinash Rathod/Junior (double role)
 Shatrughan Sinha as Moinuddin Khan (Sp. App.)
 Hema Malini as Nafisa Khatun (Sp. App.)
 Tina Munim as Anita / Rita
 Nutan as Savitri Devi
 Danny Denzongpa as Chinoy/Gama Mateen
 Deven Verma as Police Inspector Sawant
 Pran as Deputy Commissioner Saxena
 Arun Govil as Inspector Bhargav
 Mahavir Shah as Defence Lawyer of Moinuddin Khan
 Manmohan Krishna as Judge
 Iftekhar as Commissioner
 Sharat Saxena as Baburao
 Satyendra Kapoor as Jaichand
 Praveen Kumar as Xaca
 Jagdish Raj as Bhatnagar (special appearance)

Soundtrack
Lyrics: Anand Bakshi

Trivia
B.R. Chopra is seen as the dead passenger in the first scene post credits.

External links

Trimurti Films
1980s Hindi-language films
1985 films
Films scored by Kalyanji Anandji
1985 action thriller films
Indian action thriller films
1985 directorial debut films
Films directed by Rajiv Rai
Films shot in Nepal